Edward Chang is a neurosurgeon, professor, and chair of the Department of Neurological Surgery at the University of California, San Francisco. Chang, alongside Karunesh Ganguly, leads the BCI Restoration of Arm and Voice (BRAVO) clinical trial, which in July 2021 demonstrated in the New England Journal of Medicine the first brain machine interface capable of decoding full words from a paralyzed person. In 2020, Chang was elected into the National Academy of Medicine. He also co-directs the Center for Neural Engineering and Prostheses, which is a joint initiative between UCSF and UC Berkeley that aims to combine engineering with life sciences and machine learning to create biomedical devices.
 Pradel Research Award (2022)

References

External links 

American neurosurgeons
UCSF School of Medicine faculty
Year of birth missing (living people)
Living people
Members of the National Academy of Medicine